The Savannah and Northwestern Railway was a railroad in the U.S. state of Georgia. From 1906 to 1914, it was named the Brinson Railway after its owner, George M. Brinson, a businessman who had earlier built the Stillmore Air Line Railway.  The line was originally planned to run from Savannah to Sylvania and had completed from Savannah to Newington by 1909.  Around this time the Brinson took over the Savannah Valley Railroad and merged its lines into the Brinson. The company's property was sold to the Savannah and Atlanta Railway on July 16, 1917.

The Savannah and Atlanta Railway operated a mixed passenger and freight train from Waynesboro to Savannah (using its own terminal at the latter) until 1959.

In 2012, the Norfolk Southern Railway painted EMD SD70ACe #1065 in the Savannah and Atlanta paint scheme as part of its 30th anniversary celebrations.

References

External links
Savannah & Northwestern Railway Railga.com

Defunct Georgia (U.S. state) railroads
Defunct South Carolina railroads
Passenger rail transportation in Georgia (U.S. state)
Passenger rail transportation in South Carolina
Predecessors of the Central of Georgia Railway
Railway companies established in 1914
Railway companies disestablished in 1917
1906 establishments in Georgia (U.S. state)